Gregor McLennan (born 21 October 1952) is a British sociologist and a Fellow of the Academy of Social Sciences. 
He holds the Established Chair of Sociology at the University of Bristol. From 1991 to 1997 he was Head of the Department of Sociology at Massey University.

McLennan is known for his works on postcolonialism and postsecularism.

Books
 Marxism and the Methodologies of History (1981)
 Marxism, Pluralism and Beyond (1989)
 Pluralism (1995)
 Sociological Cultural Studies: Reflexivity and Positivity in the Human Sciences (2006)
 Exploring Society (3rd edition 2010 - co-authored)
 Story of Sociology (2011)

References

External links
Gregor McLennan at Bristol University

British sociologists
1952 births
Living people
Academics of the University of Bristol
Philosophers of social science
Alumni of the University of Birmingham
Alumni of the University of Bristol
Fellows of the Academy of Social Sciences
Academic staff of the Massey University